DNA/RNA-binding protein KIN17 is a protein that in humans is encoded by the KIN gene.

The protein encoded by this gene is a nuclear protein that forms intranuclear foci during proliferation and is redistributed in the nucleoplasm during the cell cycle. Short-wave ultraviolet light provokes the relocalization of the protein, suggesting its participation in the cellular response to DNA damage. Originally selected based on protein-binding with RecA antibodies, the mouse protein presents a limited similarity with a functional domain of the bacterial RecA protein, a characteristic shared by this human ortholog.

References

Further reading

External links